Steviopsis nesomii is a species of Mexican plants in the family Asteraceae. It has been found only in the State of Nuevo León in northeastern Mexico.

References

External links
photo of herbarium specimen collected in Nuevo León

Eupatorieae
Flora of Nuevo León
Endemic flora of Mexico
Plants described in 1990
Taxa named by Billie Lee Turner